Haythem Jouini (born 7 May 1993) is a Tunisian footballer who plays for Al Mokawloon Al Arab as a striker.

Club career

Espérance Tunis
A youth exponent from Espérance de Tunis, Jouini was promoted to the first team in July 2012. He made his senior debut for the club on 10 November, coming on as a late substitute for Emmanuel Clottey in a 2–1 away win against Olympique Béja.

Jouini scored his first goal as a senior on 25 November 2012, netting the first in a 3–0 home win against Olympique du Kef. He scored a brace in a 5–1 home routing of JS Kairouan on 8 December, and added a hat-trick in a 4–1 success at Olympique du Kef the following 24 February, finishing his first senior season with eight goals.

Jouini appeared in 15 matches during the 2013–14 campaign, but scored only two goals as his side was crowned champions. He would only score another brace on 27 April 2016, netting Esperance's all goals in a 2–0 home win against CA Bizertin.

On 28 August 2016, Jouini extended his contract with Espérance until 2020.

Tenerife (loan)
On 31 August 2016, Jouini signed a one-year loan contract with CD Tenerife in the Spanish Segunda División. He made his debut for the club on 10 September, replacing Amath Diedhiou in a 1–0 home win against Real Valladolid.

Jouini scored his first goal abroad on 25 September 2016, but in a 2–3 away loss against CD Mirandés. Seven days later, after being granted his first start, he was sent off for simulating a penalty in a 0–0 home draw against Getafe CF.

Al-Ain
In January 2020, Jouini transferred to Saudi Arabian side Al-Ain.

Al Mokawloon Al Arab
In November 2020, Jouini transferred to Egyptian club Al Mokawloon Al Arab.

Al-Ahli Benghazi 
In October 2021, Jouini transferred to Libyan club Al-Ahli Benghazi

References

External links

1993 births
Living people
Footballers from Tunis
Tunisian footballers
Association football forwards
Espérance Sportive de Tunis players
CD Tenerife players
Al-Ain FC (Saudi Arabia) players
Al Mokawloon Al Arab SC players
Tunisian Ligue Professionnelle 1 players
Segunda División players
Saudi First Division League players
Saudi Professional League players
Egyptian Premier League players
2015 Africa U-23 Cup of Nations players
Tunisia under-23 international footballers
Tunisian expatriate footballers
Tunisian expatriate sportspeople in Spain
Expatriate footballers in Spain
Expatriate footballers in Saudi Arabia
Tunisian expatriate sportspeople in Saudi Arabia
Expatriate footballers in Egypt
Tunisian expatriate sportspeople in Egypt